Martin Gerrard (born 19 May 1967) is a former English cricketer. He played for Gloucestershire between 1991 and 1993.

References

External links

1967 births
Living people
English cricketers
Gloucestershire cricketers
Cricketers from Bristol